The 2022–23 season is the 151st in the history of Le Havre AC and their third consecutive season in the second division. The club are participating in Ligue 2 and the Coupe de France.

Players

Out on loan

Transfers

Pre-season and friendlies

Competitions

Overall record

Ligue 2

League table

Results summary

Results by round

Matches 
The league fixtures were announced on 17 June 2022.

Coupe de France

References 

Le Havre AC seasons
Le Havre